Warren Carney is a former professional rugby league footballer who played in the 1990s and 2000s for the St. George Illawarra Dragons and Wests Tigers.

Playing career
Carney made his first grade debut for St. George Illawarra in round 23 of the 1999 NRL season against the Auckland Warriors at Mt. Smart Stadium.  

In the 2001 NRL season, he joined the Wests Tigers.  He played three games for Wests.  His final game for the club was a 44–10 loss against the Brisbane Broncos in round 17 at Campbelltown Stadium.

References

1978 births
Living people
Australian rugby league players
Place of birth missing (living people)
Rugby league hookers
St. George Illawarra Dragons players
Wests Tigers players